The TH-12 (lit. Sky Fire 12) is an oxidizer-rich gas-generator cycle rocket engine burning LOX and kerosene under development by Space Pioneer. The TH-12 utilizes 3D printing and has the highest target thrust among all commercial rocket engines in China. The engine features deep throttling for reusability, re-ignition, thrust vectoring, and multi-mode starters.

History
Space Pioneer proposed the TH-12 engine for its Tianhuo-3 (TH-3) launch vehicle. Engine development was underway in December 2020. The first gas generator test was performed in September 2022. In November 2022, a full-stage developmental TH-12 engine successfully completed its first static fire test.

References

Rocket engines of China
Rocket engines using kerosene propellant
Rocket engines using the staged combustion cycle